Idu is an industrial neighbourhood in the Nigerian capital city of Abuja.

Transport 

Idu will be the interchange station between the standard gauge railway and the Abuja light rail system.

References 

Abuja
History of Abuja